Eugnosta tenacia is a species of moth of the family Tortricidae. It is found in Brazil (Distrito Federal, Minas Gerais, Santa Catarina).

The larva have been recorded boring in tip of a shoot of B. cossinifolia.

References

Moths described in 1994
Eugnosta